José Benito Barros or simply José Barros (March 21, 1915 in El Banco, Magdalena – May 12, 2007 in Santa Marta, Magdalena) was a prominent Colombian musician, and composer of more than 800 songs in genres including cumbia, porro, merengue, currulao, paseo, bolero and tango.

Biography
Barros was the son of Portuguese Joao María Barros Traveceido and Eustasia Palomino, and the youngest of five siblings. He didn't know his parents, who died in his infancy. He was raised by his aunt Clara Palomino. He lived with only one of his siblings.

To help support his household, Barros sang in his hometown central square and at homes of wealthy people. He learned to play a variety of instruments, especially the guitar.

When he was 17, he moved to Santa Marta. He planned to travel elsewhere, but was drafted for military service. After his time in the army, he returned to his hometown, but his desire to visit new places remained. He decided to stow away on the steamship Medellin, which came from Barranquilla and was bound for Honda, an important fluvial port close to Bogota. He was discovered during the voyage, and was dropped in the city of Barrancabermeja. He met other musicians there, who had arrived in similar circumstances, and became part of various groups playing in pubs. He eventually moved to Segovia, Antioquia, to search for gold.

One year later, he arrived in Medellín, where he won a songwriting contest with a song called "El Minero" (the Miner). At  the end of the 1940s he travelled to Bogota, where he lived with drummer Jesús Lara ("Tumbelé") Pérez . He married Tulia Molano on June 12, 1943, who gave birth to a son, José, and a daughter, Sonia. He realized the music from his region was becoming increasingly popular, and devoted himself to songwriting. His first hit was his song "El Gallo Tuerto" (The One-Eyed Rooster).

His fame increased, and he was invited to countries such as Panamá, México and Argentina, which led him to write rancheras and tangos. Later, in Barranquilla, he met and engaged in a relationship with Amelia Caraballo, who gave birth to four children, Adolfo, Alberto, Alfredo and Abel Guillermo.

In the 1960s, after becoming ill, Barros returned to El Banco, and with a group of friends created and organized the Festival de la Cumbia in 1971.

In 1970 he began a relationship with Dora Manzano, with whom he had three children, Katiushka, Verushka and Boris.

Compositions
La piragua
Las Pilanderas
Momposina
El pescador
Arbolito de navidad
Me voy de la vida
Navidad negra
El gallo tuerto
El vaquero
Palmira señorial 
Carnaval 
Pesares
A la orilla del mar
Ají picante
El chupaflor
El guere guere 
La llorona loca

References

1915 births
2007 deaths
People from Magdalena Department
Colombian people of Portuguese descent
Colombian musicians